V1339 Aquilae, also known as HD 187567, is a Be star in the constellation Aquila. It is around 13 times as massive as the Sun and has 7.7 times its diameter.

Its binary nature was discovered by speckle interferometry.

References

Aquila (constellation)
Be stars
187567
Spectroscopic binaries
Aquilae, V1339
7554
B-type subgiants
097607
Durchmusterung objects